"Hey Little Man ... Wednesday's Child" is a song by English band Strawbs written by Dave Cousins. The track is to be found on the Grave New World album and the lyrics depict a father talking to his son. The song can be considered to be a continuation from an earlier track from the same album – "Hey Little Man ... Thursday's Child", which has the same tune but different lyrics. The song is performed solely by Dave Cousins.

Personnel

Dave Cousins – vocals, acoustic guitar

External links
Lyrics to "Hey Little Man ... Wednesday's Child" at Strawbsweb official site

References

Sleeve notes to album CD 540 934-2 Grave New World (A&M 1998 Remastered)

Strawbs songs
1972 songs
Songs written by Dave Cousins